The 2011–12 season is East Bengal Football Club's 5th season in the I-League, and also marks the club's 92nd season. East Bengal will seek to win their first league trophy for 7 seasons, competing in the I-League, the Federation Cup and the AFC Cup.

Key events
On 26 September 2011 East Bengal defeat Prayag United in the 2011 Indian Federation Cup semi-finals 2-1 to make the final. On 18 October 2011, East Bengal defeat Salgaocar by 9-8 (penalty - sudden death) in 2011 Indian Super Cup final to win the first trophy of the season.they also won IFA Shield and Calcutta Premiere League

Players

First-Team Squad
Transfer period is on-going for new season: 2011-12.

 

Coach: Trevor Morgan
Asst coach: Ranjan Choudhury
Goalkeeper coach: Atanu Bhattacharya
Physical trainer: Kaji Juyef Islam
Team doctor: Dr. S R Dasgupta
Physiotherapist: Rajesh Basak
Team manager: Swapan Ball, Gopal Ghosh

Transfers

In:

Out:

Stadiums
Kingfisher East Bengal F.C. have been using both the Salt Lake Stadium and the East Bengal Ground sense Salt Lake Stadium opened in 1984. As of today the Salt Lake Stadium is used for East Bengal's I-League, AFC Cup, and Federation Cup games. The East Bengal Ground is used for the Calcutta Football League matches.

Kit
Main Sponsor: Kingfisher (Parent Company United Breweries Group is 50% stake holder in the Club).
Co-sponsor: Tower Group
Co-sponsor: Saradha Group
Co-sponsor: Rose-Valley

Competitions

Overall

Overview

Federation Cup

Group C

Fixtures & results

BECAMEX IDC Cup

Fixtures & results

Super Cup

Last year's Federation Cup Champion East Bengal beat last year's I-League Champion Salgaocar in the Super Cup on sudden death.

Fixtures & results

I League

League table

Results summary

Results by round

Fixtures & results

Calcutta Football League

Fixtures & results

IFA Shield

Fixtures & results

AFC Cup

Group stage
The group were drawn on 6 December 2011 in (Kuala Lumpur, Malaysia)

Fixtures & results

Notes
Note 2: Due to the political crisis in Yemen, the AFC requested Yemeni clubs to play their home matches at neutral venues.

Statistics

Appearances 
Players with no appearances are not included in the list.

Goal scorers

References

East
East Bengal Club seasons